The Kirenga is a river in Irkutsk Oblast in Russia. The name originated in an Evenki word.

There are many settlements in the river valley. The Baikal Amur Mainline follows and crosses the Kirenga between Magistralny and Ulkan.

Course
It is a right tributary of the Lena which flows north between the upper Lena and Lake Baikal. The Kirenga marks the eastern limit of the Lena-Angara Plateau. The river flows along the Cis-Baikal Depression, limited by the Akitkan Range to the east. Finally it joins the Lena at the town of Kirensk.

The Kirenga is fed mainly by rain. It freezes up in late October to early November and stays under the ice until late April to May.

Tributaries 
Its main tributaries are the Ulkan, Minya, Okunayka and Kutima from the right, as well as the Khanda from the left.

See also
List of rivers of Russia

References

Rivers of Irkutsk Oblast